Alexander Moskalenko (born November 4, 1969) is a Russian former competitive trampoline gymnast. He is the 2000 Olympic champion and 2004 Olympic silver medalist in men's individual trampoline.

Career 
In the first half of the 1990s, Moskalenko won three world titles in individual trampoline (1990, 1992, 1994) and two in synchro (1992, 1994).

Moskalenko came out of retirement in 1998, when he learned that individual trampoline would become an Olympic discipline in 2000. It became a FIG discipline on 1 January 1999. Moskalenko decided to submit himself to a rigorous training programme to reestablish himself at the top of the ranking list and qualify for the Olympics. At the 1999 World Championships, he won gold in individual and synchro.

At the 2000 Summer Olympics in Sydney, Moskalenko became the first Olympic champion in men's trampoline, finishing ahead of Australia's Ji Wallace. The following year, he won gold in individual and synchro at the 2001 World Championships. He was awarded the silver medal at the 2003 World Championships behind Germany's Henrik Stehlik.

Moskalenko suffered from back pain during the whole of 2004. He won the silver medal behind Ukraine's Yuri Nikitin at the 2004 Summer Olympics in Athens, Greece. He retired on July 30 at the Dobrovolski World Cup in Krasnodar and was presented with a race horse. Almost thirty champions of different sports were present at the ceremony.

References

External links
 
 
 

1969 births
People from Bryukhovetsky District
Living people
Russian male trampolinists
Gymnasts at the 2000 Summer Olympics
Gymnasts at the 2004 Summer Olympics
Olympic gymnasts of Russia
Olympic gold medalists for Russia
Olympic silver medalists for Russia
Olympic medalists in gymnastics
Medalists at the 2000 Summer Olympics
Medalists at the 2004 Summer Olympics
World Games gold medalists
Competitors at the 2001 World Games
Medalists at the Trampoline Gymnastics World Championships
Sportspeople from Krasnodar Krai